Hovatter's Wildlife Zoo, also known as the West Virginia Zoo, is a zoo in Kingwood, West Virginia. The zoo is open seasonally from April to October, and on weekends in November. Opening and closing dates vary from year to year.

Animals at the zoo include
African lions
Bengal tigers (Orange and White)
leopards (spotted and black)
bobcats
chimpanzees 
olive baboons
grivet monkeys
capuchin (Black and White)
Patas monkeys
Ring-tailed lemurs
rheas
Aoudad
Emu
Camels (dromedary) 
African pygmy goats
Miniature donkeys
Pot-bellied pigs
rattlesnakes (Diamondback)
budgerigars
turtles (Sulcata tortoise)
Spotted hyena
Patagonian cavy
reticulated giraffes 
Llama
Watusi
Chapman's zebra
Scarlet macaw
Domestic turkey
Fennec Fox
Peacock
Domestic duck
Wolf
Domestic rabbit
Gibbon
Domestic horse
Eurasian eagle-owl
Red kangaroo
American alligator
Serval
Grizzly bear 
African crested porcupines
Wildebeest
Wallaby
Eland
Nilgai
scimitar-horned oryx
Kookaburra
Coyote
Prevost's squirrel
Elk
Muntjac
Syrian brown bear
Sitatunga
Mallard duck
Greater kudu
Fallow deer
Cotton-top tamarin
Bactrian camel
Warthog
Japanese macaque

Past animals
Whitetail deer
Wild boar
Capybara
Bison
Raccoon
Prairie dog
Sumatran tiger
Cougar
Asian black bear
Spider monkey
Asian Elephants

Tiger cub mishandling
In 2015, West Virginia Zoo took tiger cubs from their mother at birth and showed them off behind a gift shop counter at two to three weeks old, before the tiger cubs had been vaccinated. West Virginia Zoo also used the tiger cubs for photo shoots. The U.S. Department of Agriculture Animal and Plant Health Inspection Service cited West Virginia Zoo for exposing the tiger cubs to the public before their immune protection had sufficiently developed to protect them against disease, risking their health and making the zoo noncompliant with the Animal Welfare Act.

Notes

External links

Zoos in West Virginia
Buildings and structures in Preston County, West Virginia
Tourist attractions in Preston County, West Virginia